Strictly Elvis is an extended play (EP) by American singer and musician Elvis Presley released in January 1960. It peaked at number one in the number-one EPs chart in the United Kingdom and was five weeks in the number-one, until it was superseded by Expresso Bongo, which became number-one on April 23, 1960.

An EP, also called "Strictly Elvis", had been issued in the US in January 1957. This contained a completely different set of tracks; it was not issued in the UK until 1964, when it came out under the title "Elvis For You, Volume 2". The UK "Strictly Elvis" EP had no direct US equivalent.

Track listing
"Old Shep" (Red Foley, Arthur Willis) 	
"Any Place Is Paradise" (Joe "Cornbread" Thomas) 	
"Paralyzed" (Otis Blackwell, Elvis Presley) 	
"Is It So Strange" (Faron Young)

Personnel
Elvis Presley – vocals, acoustic guitar, piano on "Old Shep" and "Paralyzed".
Scotty Moore – electric guitar
Gordon Stoker – piano on "Any Place Is Paradise"
Dudley Brooks – piano on "Is It So Strange"
Bill Black – double bass
D.J. Fontana – drums
The Jordanaires – back-up vocals

External links

References

Elvis Presley EPs
1957 EPs
RCA Records EPs